John Smith alias Dyer (1498/1499 – 1571), of Ipswich, Suffolk, was an English politician.

He was a Member of Parliament (MP) for Ipswich in 1547, 1553 and 1554.

References

1490s births
1571 deaths

Year of birth uncertain
Members of the Parliament of England (pre-1707) for Ipswich
English MPs 1547–1552
English MPs 1553 (Edward VI)
English MPs 1554–1555